Asemum caseyi is a species of beetle in the family Cerambycidae. It was described by Linsley in 1957.

References

Spondylidinae
Beetles described in 1957